The Ministry of Personnel Management is an independent organisation under Office of Prime Minister of South Korea responsible for human resource management of the executive branch of the government. It also oversees the government employees pension which is managed by Government Employees Pension Service. It is led by vice-ministerial-level Minister of Personal Management. The current Ministry was formed in 2014 and moved to its current headquarters in Sejong City in 2016. Its history can be traced back to 1948 when Bureau of Personal Management was created under now-Ministry of the Interior and Safety and Presidential Commission on Higher Civil Service Examination.

It has two child agencies both led by vice-ministerial-level heads - National Human Resources Development Institute (NHI) and Appeals Commission.

See also
 National Human Resources Development Institute
 Ministry of Security and Public Administration
 Ministry of the Interior and Safety (South Korea)

References

External links

Official website

Government ministries of South Korea